Taita may refer to:

 Taita people, a Bantu ethnic group in Kenya
 Taita language, a Bantu language
Taitā, New Zealand, a suburb of Lower Hutt City
 Taita Hills, a mountain range in Kenya
 Taita Cushitic languages, an extinct pair of Afro-Asiatic languages spoken in the Taita Hills
 Taita falcon, a small falcon found in central and eastern Africa
 Taita Line, a railway line in Gifu prefecture, Japan
 Taița, a tributary of Lake Babadag in Romania
 Taița, a former village in Hamcearca Commune, Romania
 Taita I, king of ancient Palistin
 Taita, another name for the leavened flatbread injera popular in Ethiopia and Eritrea
 Taita, a fictional character from The Egyptian Series, beginning with the novel River God, by Wilbur Smith
 Taita, another name for a yage shaman in Colombia.

See also 
 
 National Taiwan University, colloquially called "Taita" by locals

Language and nationality disambiguation pages